L'art des femmes is the fourth studio album by French pop singer Jeanne Mas, released in 1990.

Track listing
"L'amour du mal" (Jeanne Mas, Massimo Calabrese, Piero Calabrese, Roberto Zaneli) – 5:23
"Le contrechamp" (J. Mas, M. Calabrese, P. Calabrese, R. Zaneli) – 4:34
"Elle est moi" (J. Mas, M. Calabrese, P. Calabrese, R. Zaneli) – 4:55
"Les bras en croix" (J. Mas, M. Calabrese, P. Calabrese, R. Zaneli) – 5:05
"Les rêves de Maud" (J. Mas, M. Calabrese, P. Calabrese, R. Zaneli) – 4:27
"Tous les cris les S.O.S." (Daniel Balavoine) – 5:41
"Shakespeare" (J. Mas) – 4:30
"L'alba" (J. Mas, P. Calabrese) – 4:27
"L'art des femmes (Angela)" (J. Mas, M. Calabrese, P. Calabrese, R. Zaneli) – 3:49
"Alexandre M." (J. Mas, M. Calabrese, P. Calabrese, R. Zaneli) – 5:22
"L'amour du mal" contains an extract of Charles Baudelaire's poem "L'albatros"

Album credits

Personnel
Jeanne Mas - vocals
Marco Rinalduzzi - guitar
Tony Levin - bass guitar, Chapman stick
Piero Calabrese - keyboards, programming
Christophe Deschamps - drums

Production
Producers - Piero Calabrese, Jeanne Mas
Arrangements - Piero Calabrese
Engineer - Marco Lecci
Assistant - Manu, Philippe, Bob
Management - Christian Blanchard
Assistant management - Christine Sterlay

Design
Photography - Paul Bella, Bernard Mouillon
Cover design - Jeanne Mas, Créature

References

External links
 Official site

1990 albums
EMI Records albums
Jeanne Mas albums